Mykhailo Storozhenko (12 November 1937 – 30 March 2020) was a Soviet athlete. He competed in the men's decathlon at the 1964 Summer Olympics.

References

1937 births
2020 deaths
Athletes (track and field) at the 1964 Summer Olympics
Soviet decathletes
Olympic athletes of the Soviet Union
Athletes from Saint Petersburg